Ouaninou Department is a department of Bafing Region in Woroba District, Ivory Coast. In 2021, its population was 65,981 and its seat is the settlement of Ouaninou. The sub-prefectures of the department are Gbelo, Gouékan, Koonan, Ouaninou, Saboudougou, and Santa.

History
Ouaninou Department was created in 2011 as part of the restructuring of the subdivisions of Ivory Coast, when departments were converted from the second-level administrative subdivisions of the country to the third-level subdivisions. It was created by splitting Touba Department.

Notes

Departments of Bafing Region
States and territories established in 2011
2011 establishments in Ivory Coast